Dreposcia is a genus of beetles belonging to the family Leiodidae.

The species of this genus are found in Europe.

Species:
 Dreposcia brevipalpis (Reitter, 1901) 
 Dreposcia relicta Lohse, 1965

References

Leiodidae
Beetle genera